Landgraben may refer to:

 Landgraben (Dresden), a river of Saxony, Germany
 Landgraben (Mecklenburg-Vorpommern), a river of Mecklenburg-Vorpommern, Germany